Amnun is a workers' moshav in the Upper Galilee in northern Israel. Located on the Korazim Plateau, it belongs to the Mevo'ot HaHermon Regional Council and HaOved HaTzioni, a part of Hanoar Hatzioni. It is located in the Korazim region, north of Kfar Nahum and the Sea of Galilee and east of Safed.

History
The moshav was founded by the Jewish Agency in 1983 for evacuees of former Israeli settlements in Sinai after the signing of the Egypt–Israel peace treaty and residents of neighboring moshavim.

The name is based on the Tilapia fish, called "Amnun" in Hebrew, which lives in the nearby Kinneret lake.

It was founded on the land of the depopulated Palestinian village of Al-Samakiyya.

References

Moshavim
Populated places in Northern District (Israel)
Populated places established in 1983
1983 establishments in Israel
Egyptian-Jewish culture in Israel